Michael John Rinder (born 10 April 1955) is an Australian-American former senior executive of the Church of Scientology International (CSI) and the Sea Organization based in the United States. From 1982 to 2007, Rinder served on the board of directors of CSI and also held the post of executive director of its Office of Special Affairs, overseeing the corporate, legal and public relations matters of Scientology at the international level.

Rinder left Scientology in 2007. Ever since then, he has spoken about the physical and mental abuse inflicted upon staff members by Chairman of Scientology, David Miscavige and by Rinder himself before his departure from the cult and explained how abuse was embedded into the culture of Scientology. From 2016 to 2019, he co-hosted the A&E documentary series Leah Remini: Scientology and the Aftermath. In 2020, he and Remini reunited to launch the podcast Scientology: Fair Game. In September 2022, he published a memoir named A Billion Years: My Escape From a Life in the Highest Ranks of Scientology.

Scientology career

Early years 
Rinder was born in Adelaide, Australia, to Ian and Barbara Rinder in 1955. When he was 5 years old his parents became interested in Scientology and the family began attending the Church of Scientology International center in Australia. After finishing high school he joined the Sea Org on the ship Apollo at 18. This ship functioned as the headquarters for Sea Org. Rinder quickly became an early member of the Commodore's Messenger Organization, after which he continued to rank up until he had his position with the Office of Special Affairs.

In a 2006 interview with Rolling Stone, Rinder said he had experienced discrimination in Australia during the period when the state of Victoria had banned Scientology: "You couldn't own Scientology books ... If you did, you had to hide them because if the police came and found them, they'd take them away."

Office of Special Affairs 
As executive director of the Office of Special Affairs, he served as the chief spokesperson and representative of Scientology to the media for 25 years until replaced by Tommy Davis in 2005 under orders from David Miscavige. This office is responsible for overseeing public relations and legal issues for the church, as well as handling "internal investigations into members' behavior."

In a 2016 interview with Rolling Stone, Rinder describes the scope of his position:

Rinder cites specific examples of this duty, saying that he personally traveled to London to prevent journalist John Sweeney, who is responsible for Scientology and Me, from attending a movie premiere and to attempt to "discredit Sweeney in any way that he could".

Departure from Scientology
Rinder has said that he was living in The Hole for over two years "when he was suddenly pulled from his prison and sent on [a] mission to London to defend the Church against John Sweeney's film", Scientology and Me, in March 2007. Rinder defended Scientology leader David Miscavige, but Miscavige was unhappy that Rinder was unable to stop the documentary from being shown. As a result, Rinder "was to report to the church's facility in Sussex, and dig ditches" and then was to be allowed to return to the United States. 

Rinder claimed his moment of clarity came in a confrontation with the filmmaker, which was recorded on video. In the exchange, Rinder denied Sweeney's allegation that he had been abused by Miscavige and was instructed by him to deny it happened. Rinder realized afterwards though that Sweeney's allegation about him was true and he was unable to rationalize why he was denying it. Afterwards, instead of reporting to Sussex, Rinder decided to leave Scientology.

Rinder went to Virginia and told Scientology officials that he wanted to speak to his wife and also wanted his possessions. He did not speak to his wife, but was sent a FedEx package with a check for $5,000. His family photos were not sent. Rinder's official biography has since been removed from the official Scientology website.

Criticism of Church of Scientology 

After leaving Scientology, Rinder relocated to Denver, Colorado, and initially didn't intend to speak out against the organization and in 2009, when St. Petersburg Times asked Rinder for an interview, he declined. However, a month later, two Washington-based Scientology lawyers went to his home unannounced, informed Rinder that they knew about the newspaper's visit and asked what he had revealed. This incident was another moment of clarity according to Rinder because he realized he was now being subjected to Scientology's practice of Fair Game despite declining to speak out. Afterwards, he decided to do the interview with the Times and said he was speaking out because "I don't want people to continue to be hurt and tricked and lied to." He spoke about Scientology's management and repeated beatings, he gave as well as received, and the interviews became part of the paper's "The Truth Rundown" special issue.

Since then, Rinder has given numerous interviews to journalists and participated in several documentaries about Scientology. In March 2010, Rinder again confirmed allegations of abuse within Scientology to CNN's Anderson Cooper on Anderson Cooper 360°. 

On 28 September 2010, Rinder appeared on The Secrets of Scientology broadcast by the BBC series Panorama. In 2015 he appeared in the HBO documentary entitled Going Clear: Scientology and the Prison of Belief by Alex Gibney which is based on the book by Lawrence Wright. Along with Leah Remini, Rinder co-hosts the A&E documentary series Leah Remini: Scientology and the Aftermath. He further published a memoir in September 2022 named A Billion Years: My Escape From a Life in the Highest Ranks of Scientology.

His intimate knowledge about the organization, both as a Sea Org member for 46 years and as head of the OSA for 25 years, has been a revelation about the organization to the world. Rinder has discussed how the OSA responds to critics of the church who are Scientologists and those who aren't and stated that several events in the history of Scientology have rocked the organization: the death of L. Ron Hubbard in 1986, the discovery of Operation Snow White, the rise of the Internet in the 1990s, the mobile revolution of the 2000s and the rise of social media in the 2010s. These events have made it difficult for the church to attract new followers and retain current adherents and resulted in the church taking increasingly more draconian measures to ensure its survival.

Actions by church against critics 
According to Rinder, Scientology's two principal weapons against critics within the organization are Auditing and Disconnection. Initially, auditing was meant to be a form of counseling (for which members pay over $500 per hour) to obtain the spiritual benefits of Scientology but by the time of his departure, he stated the practice had degenerated into a tool for interrogation and mind control. Non-compliant parishioners are labelled "suppressive persons" and disconnected from by other members of the church, including family members.

Auditing 

The device used during auditing, called an E-meter, has a disclaimer on it that says "it does nothing by itself" but members are told that it functions like a lie detector. Mike Rinder, Mark Rathbun, Marc and Claire Headley state that auditing sessions are secretly recorded, including ones with secrets about Tom Cruise and initially were forms of spiritual counseling. That changed due to the reaction by many early Scientologists to the Xenu origin of man story found in OT III. They balked at it and began leaving the church and encouraging others to do so as well. According to Rinder, this is where the term "suppressive person" originated from. Rinder also stated that the prophecy of Hubbard's messiah like return after death to prevent an apocalyptic alien invasion in OT VIII (released in 1988, two years after his death) garnered a similar response, prompting many high-ranking Scientologists – including Pat Broeker – to leave the organization as a result.  According to Rinder, virtually all of the executives, himself included, had rejected both of the above mentioned Scientological tenets, however they nevertheless continued to train parishioners to accept them as true.

Rinder's moment of clarity after the confrontation with Sweeney came when he realized that it was the auditing sessions that led him to deny Sweeney's allegations that he knew were true. He later discovered the training he received during those sessions was developed from a book written by Hubbard in 1955 called Brain-Washing.

Disconnection 

According to Rinder, for decades enrollment has been declining, but departures were more concerning. Without new Scientologists entering the organization, the church became increasingly dependent on retaining the followers they already had. The church's disconnection policy is primarily how the church discourages Scientologists from departing and is a mechanism of emotional blackmail. All communication with any Scientologist that "blows", or has an unauthorized departure as Rinder did, is immediately ceased. Since Scientologists are not permitted to have social relationships with non-Scientologists, they essentially lose contact with all their social contacts when they leave. Sea Org members are even more vulnerable when they leave because they are financially dependent on the church. Any Scientologist that doesn't disconnect from someone that leaves will be declared a suppressive person and expelled as well. This policy led to what Rinder stated are "captive" Scientologists – church members who stay not because they are faithful to the tenets but because they fear disconnection – and cites Leah Remini's mother as an example of this because she stated she wanted to leave Scientology prior to Leah's departure but delayed doing so because she didn't want to be disconnected from the rest of her family.

Rinder stated that the policy of "routing out", or authorized departure, is a sham. The church claims that anyone can voluntarily leave, or route out, and not be declared by paying a fee for leaving but in reality everyone that leaves gets declared by policy because they will have access to the internet after leaving and any parishioner who remains in contact with them will also have unauthorized access as well.

After leaving Scientology in 2007, Rinder and his first wife, Cathy, divorced after 35 years, and he has had no contact with her or his two adult children from his first marriage because of disconnection. In April 2010, Rinder, who lived in Clearwater, Florida, attempted to meet his son, who also lives in Clearwater, after learning he was diagnosed with cancer, but his son refused to see him. The church also refused to let him on the property and had him cited for trespassing by the Clearwater Police. Rinder stated his biggest regrets in life is having two children that were born into Scientology and having enforced the disconnection policy (to which he is now being subjected) when he was director of the OSA.

He stated the rise of social media in the late 2000s has allowed ex-Scientologists to connect with each other and form support groups for members who have left or want to leave. He credits the disconnection policy for the consistently negative media portrayal of Scientology. The reports of Scientology extracting large fees and their space opera beliefs were controversial, but their portrayal didn't become consistently negative until ex-Scientologists started sharing their stories through social media about families intentionally being broken up by disconnection because a family member decided to leave (or wasn't a member of) the church of Scientology.

Fair Game 

Rinder stated that his primary role as Director of the Office of Special Affairs was defending the church against critics by employing Scientology's fair game tactics which essentially are to "intimidate, defame, harass, discredit, and effectively silence any criticism of Scientology". He and fellow defector Marty Rathbun, former head of the Religious Technology Center, revealed through these interviews how this was done. For instance, Rinder told the Times that Scientology critic Bob Minton ceased his criticism of Scientology after Rinder discovered "things that, really, he was worried about and had caused problems for him in the investigation that we had done" and that they had reached a private settlement. Rinder regrets his role in that investigation and has stated he considered Minton a friend at the time of Minton's death in January 2010. Both have said the policy was backfiring because victims, such as John Sweeney, reported their experiences with fair game and this led to more negative publicity and thus produced more critics than they were silencing. Rinder's own decision to speak out against Scientology is an example of this as well because he decided to speak out against the church after being victimized by fair game despite not criticizing the church after leaving. Rinder has been victimized by fair game numerous times and recalled an incident where he was sitting in his car at a doctor's office parking lot during a phone interview with BBC journalist John Sweeney when "five senior members of [Scientology's] California-based international management team – surrounded and screamed at him". The screaming was so loud, Sweeney was able to record the episode and later aired the recording on The Secrets of Scientology broadcast by the BBC's Panorama program.

The policy was becoming increasingly ineffective starting the 1980s as it was unable to stop publication of A Piece of Blue Sky by ex-Scientologist Jon Atack or the documentary Scientology and Me which ultimately led to Rinder's departure. The internet made it even less effective because information can be uploaded anonymously and then viewed by anyone with internet access.

Rinder said fair game's most significant failure came with the discovery of Operation Snow White by the FBI and the subsequent raid of hundreds of church facilities as a result. The operation was undertaken as a result of the continued refusal of the IRS to reinstate the church's tax exempt status after more than two decades of fair game tactics. The raid led to the discovery of hundreds of documents detailing criminal activity within the church which led to the prosecution of dozens of high ranking church officials and provided grounds for the IRS to continue to deny tax exempt status to the church as well. According to Rinder, David Miscavige's claim that fair game was ultimately successful in regaining tax exempt status in 1993 is not true. It was reinstated because they abandoned fair game against the IRS after Hubbard's death and instead adhered to the IRS's policy for obtaining tax exempt status.

According to Rinder, the church never recovered from the FBI raid because it provided documentary evidence to support critics' claims of the church and was the primary source of information used in the article The Thriving Cult of Greed and Power published by Time magazine in 1991.

Vexatious litigation 

After the FBI raid, Rinder stated that fair game tactics had to be changed. Intimidation tactics were still used but took the form of vexatious litigation instead. Rinder stated this was effective at silencing organizations from disseminating information critical of Scientology and credits them with why the public was relatively unaware of the information seized during the FBI raid. Not until the Time magazine article, "The Thriving Cult of Greed and Power," and the litigation that followed did that end. The year prior to the defamation lawsuit against Time magazine, the church was successful at shutting down the Cult Awareness Network (CAN) with these lawsuits. However, unlike CAN, the Time Warner Corporation had the resources to defend itself and the documents from the FBI raid to justify their claims. The biggest impact was that Time Warner was able to successfully prove that this lawsuit was vexatious in nature and meant to financially drain the critic into submission and not to resolve any actual dispute. Because the discovery process allowed for the subpoena of church documents, it essentially allowed the church to be "raided again" and the documents that described the churches vexatious litigation policy were found. The result was the church lost its lawsuit and was permanently discredited in all future litigation. The courts were also no longer receptive to litigation brought by the church after the case either because it had been conclusively demonstrated that the church was abusing the legal system. The approximately seven million dollars the church spent attempting to discredit the article had the opposite effect of drawing more attention to the case as well.

In the early 1990s, when the internet was in its infancy, internet startups could be intimidated by the threat of litigation by the church but a decade later those same companies were now large corporations with the resources to defend themselves and lobbied for legislation that shielded them from user liabilities, "loser pays" laws that indemnify the church if they lose a lawsuit, and anti-SLAPP laws that prohibit them from using lawsuits to financially drain a critic into submission. Lawsuits against individual critics did continue but clever defendants began using the process of discovery to circumvent Scientology's copyright infringement claims by deliberately introducing secret church documents into evidence, making them part of the public record and thus viewable by anyone. An example of this "boomerang effect" was the 1993 case Church of Scientology International v. Fishman and Geertz.

According to Rinder, the Time Warner lawsuit is ultimately what was responsible for "shattering the cone of silence" concerning criticism of Scientology. In the decade that followed, criticism became bolder, more public and consistently negative especially in the media.

Awards and charitable work 

Mike Rinder was co-executive producer of the show Leah Remini: Scientology and the Aftermath in 2019 and 2020 when the show was nominated for the Emmy Awards, winning an Emmy for Outstanding Hosted Nonfiction Series Or Special - 2020.

In 2018, Mike Rinder co-founded The Aftermath Foundation, a nonprofit which helps people escape from scientology, and connects former Sea Org members with housing, work and other support upon leaving the church. Rinder is a board member of the foundation.

In 2019, CHILD USA awarded Mike Rinder and Leah Remini the Barbara Blaine Trailblazer Award for having "taken a brave, public stand for justice and given voice to many of Scientology's victims." As of 2023, Rinder sits on the CHILD USA board of directors where he helps to "[change] the laws in numerous states across the US with legislation enacted to make it possible for victims to pursue their day in court."

Personal life 

Rinder had three children with his first wife Cathy: daughter Taryn, son Benjamin, and another daughter, Kimberley, who died in infancy. 

In 2012, his partner, Christie King Collbran, gave birth to the couple's son, Jack. In 2013, Rinder and Christie married, and he became stepfather to her son, Shane. 

According to his blog, he now lives in Palm Harbor, Florida with his wife, son and stepson.

References

External links 

 
 mrinder.com
 Scientology:Fair Game Podcast with Leah Remini and Mike Rinder

1955 births
Living people
Australian emigrants to the United States
Australian podcasters
Australian television presenters
Australian whistleblowers
Critics of Scientology
Scientology officials
People from Clearwater, Florida
People from Palm Harbor, Florida
American former Scientologists
Primetime Emmy Award winners